Yeti Gadda Kistapur is a village in the Medak District in the Telangana state of India.

Geography
This village also pronounced as Eti Gadda Kistapur. It is located at Latitude 17.91251 and Longitude 78.8136.

Mondal  : Thoguta
District : Medak District
State   : Telangana
Country : India
PIN     : 502301
STD Code: 08457

References

External links

Villages in Medak district